A list of Kannada language films produced in the Kannada film industry in India in 2016.
 Films are generally released every Friday or Festival Day 
 In addition films can be released on specific festival days.

Film awards events
 63rd National Film Awards
 Karnataka State Film Awards 2015 
 63rd Filmfare Awards South
 5th South Indian International Movie Awards 
 Suvarna Film Awards, by Suvarna channel.
 Udaya Film Awards, by Udaya Channel
 Bengaluru International Film Festival
 Bangalore Times Film Awards

Scheduled releases

January–June

July–December

Notable deaths

References

External links
 Kannada Movies of 2016 at Internet Movie Database

Lists of 2016 films by country or language
2016
2016 in Indian cinema